Mawlana Murad was an Islamic scholar and teacher based in the city of Mecca in Ottoman Arabia.

Biography
Murad was born in the 1700s in Bengal. Following the Battle of Plassey in 1757 and the subsequent rise in British colonial authority, some Bengali Muslims such as Murad had become so concerned that they made the decision to emigrate to Muslim lands such as the Ottoman Empire.

Murad settled in the city of Mecca in the 18th century and became recognised as a knowledgeable Islamic scholar, which is why he was referred to with the honorific prefix of Mawlana.

In 1799, a group of Bengalis, including Basharat Ali and 18-year old Shariatullah Taluqdar, migrated to Mecca and were offered accommodation in Murad's residence. Murad taught fiqh, Arabic literature, and the history of Islam to Shariatullah for two years.

See also
Bangladeshis in the Middle East

References

18th-century Bengalis
19th-century Bengalis
Bengali Muslim scholars of Islam
18th-century Muslim theologians
19th-century Muslim theologians
18th-century people from the Ottoman Empire
19th-century people from the Ottoman Empire
Educators from the Ottoman Empire
Muslims from the Ottoman Empire
Historians of Islam
People from Mecca
Saudi Arabian people of Bengali descent